The 1916 All-Ireland Senior Football Championship Final was the 29th All-Ireland Final and the deciding match of the 1916 All-Ireland Senior Football Championship, an inter-county Gaelic football tournament for the top teams in Ireland. 

The Croke Park pitch frosted over overnight, but was pronounced playable. Mayo were the first Connacht team to reach the final, but Wexford won by a wide margin. The low attendance was due to the lack of special trains under the martial law introduced after the Easter Rising.

It was the second of four All-Ireland football titles won by Wexford in the 1910s.

Seán O'Kennedy, whose brother Gus played at corner-forward, captained Wexford.

References

Gaelic football
All-Ireland Senior Football Championship Finals
Mayo county football team matches
Wexford county football team matches